Valley View High School may refer to

 Valley View High School (Arkansas), Jonesboro, Arkansas
 Valley View High School (Moreno Valley, California), Moreno Valley, California
 Valley View High School (Ontario, California), Ontario, California
 Valley View High School (Ohio), Germantown, Ohio
 Valley View High School (Pennsylvania), Archbald, Pennsylvania
 Valley View High School (Valley View, Texas), Valley View, Texas